Yeates Bluff is a steep, mainly ice-covered bluff surmounted by a 1,190 m peak at its north end, standing between Lennox-King and Beaver Glaciers, 4 miles (6 km) northeast of Mount Nickerson in Queen Alexandra Range, Antarctica. Named by New Zealand Geological Survey Antarctic Expedition (NZGSAE) (1959–60) for Peter A. Yeates, for two seasons radio operator at Scott Base.

Cliffs of the Ross Dependency
Shackleton Coast